Ruben van Bommel (born 3 August 2004) is a Dutch professional footballer who plays as a winger for Eerste Divisie club MVV.

Career
Van Bommel progressed through the PSV academy, before moving to MVV in 2020. 

He made his debut in the Eerste Divisie on 8 August 2022 away at Jong AZ appearing as a second-half substitute for Koen Kostons. His brother Thomas van Bommel started the game and they were playing alongside each other for 20 minutes until Thomas was subbed off late in the second half. On his first appearance at Maastricht's home ground De Geusselt, a week after his professional debut, van Bommel scored his first professional goal in a 3–1 win against NAC Breda. Van Bommel received some notoriety in September 2022 when he was one of two players, along with Jaymillio Pinas in a match between MVV and Dordrecht who were booked for diving inside a minute of each other. On 10 February 2023, he scored a brace and provided an assist in a 5–1 league win over TOP Oss. His second goal was a beautiful chip over opposing goalkeeper Thijs Janssen. After the game he stated that he intended to extend his contract with MVV.

Style of play
A left winger, Van Bommel is known for his acceleration, skillset, and for his runs into the box. He has been compared to Ángel Di María by Hans Kraay Jr..

Personal life
Van Bommel's father is Mark van Bommel, and his brother is Thomas van Bommel, while his maternal grandfather is Bert van Marwijk. His father played for the Netherlands in the 2010 FIFA World Cup Final, in which van Marwijk was the manager.

Career statistics

References

External links
 

2004 births
Living people
21st-century Dutch people
Association football midfielders
Dutch footballers
Eerste Divisie players
Footballers from Limburg (Netherlands)
MVV Maastricht players
People from Meerssen